The judo competitions at the 2015 Games of the Small States of Europe took place on 5 June 2015 at the Laugaból Ármann Gymnastic Hall in Reykjavík.

Medal summary

Medal table

Men's competition

Women's competition

External links
 

2015 Games of the Small States of Europe
European Games, Small States
2015